Arthur Murray (born Moses Teichman, April 4, 1895 – March 3, 1991) was an American ballroom dancer and businessman, whose name is most often associated with the dance studio chain that bears his name.

Early life and start in dance

Arthur Murray was born in 1895 as Moses Teichman in Galicia, Austria-Hungary, to a family of Jewish background. In August 1897, he was brought to America by his mother Sarah on the S.S. Friesland, and landed at Ellis Island. They settled in Ludlow Street, in the Lower East Side of Manhattan with his father, Abraham Teichmann.

He soon began teaching ballroom dancing to patients from the greater Boston, area, at the Devereux Mansion Physical Therapy Clinic in Marblehead, Massachusetts, before moving to Asheville, North Carolina. Murray arrived at the Battery Park Hotel November 28, 1914, at age 19 and began teaching dance there. At the outbreak of World War I, under the pressure of the anti-German sentiment prevalent in the U.S., Murray changed his last name of Teichman to a less German-sounding name. The Asheville Citizen reported in 1920 that Murray had spent six summers teaching at the Battery Park. At that time, he had also begun his chain of dance studios and become a well-paid dance writer. He had also signed a deal to produce records for teaching dance for Columbia Gramophone Company. Murray released many successful dance records for Columbia as well as Capitol Records, some of which included coupons for dance lessons at Arthur Murray Studios.

In 1919, Murray began studying business administration at the Georgia School of Technology, and taught ballroom dancing in Atlanta at the Georgian Terrace Hotel. In 1920, he organized the world's first "radio dance"; a band on the Georgia Tech campus played "Ramblin' Wreck from Georgia Tech" and other songs, which were broadcast to a group of about 150 dancers (mostly Tech students) situated atop the roof of the Capital City Club in downtown Atlanta.

On April 24, 1925, Murray married his famous dance partner, Kathryn Kohnfelder (September 15, 1906, Jersey City, New Jersey – August 6, 1999, Honolulu, Hawaii), whom he had met at a radio station in New Jersey. She had been in the audience while he was broadcasting a dance lesson.

The start of Arthur Murray Studios

After WWII, Murray's business grew with the rise of interest in Latin dance, and he regularly taught and broadcast in Cuba in the 1950s. Murray went on television with a dance program hosted by his wife, Kathryn; The Arthur Murray Party ran from 1950 to 1960, on CBS, NBC, DuMont, ABC, and then on CBS. Among the Arthur Murray dance instructors in the early 1950s was future television evangelist D. James Kennedy, who won first prize in a nationwide dance contest.  He appeared as a guest on the June 17, 1956, episode of What's My Line?.

The Murrays retired in 1964; but they continued to be active for some time, appearing as guests on the Dance Fever disco show in the late 1970s. By then, there were more than 3,560 dance studios bearing his name. In 2020, about 275 Arthur Murray Studios remained in operation.  Arthur Murray Dance Studios claims to be the second-oldest franchised company (the first, A&W Restaurants, began in 1919). In 2012, Arthur Murray Studios celebrated more than 100 years of teaching dance at over 270 Arthur Murray Dance Studios in 22 countries across the globe. These range from studios in Australia (where the prestigious Crows Nest and Parramatta Dance Studios are located) and throughout North America, South America, Europe and Asia.

Death
For many years, Murray had two homes – one in Honolulu and another in Rye, New York. He died at his Honolulu home at the age of 95; according to his daughter, Phyllis Murray McDowell, pneumonia was the cause of death. He had been active and in good health until a short time before his death.

In popular culture
Hal Borne and His Orchestra recorded the Mercer-Schertzing song in a Soundie released May 25, 1942, with the Three Murtah Sisters.

References

External links 

Arthur Murray Dance Studios

1895 births
1991 deaths
American ballroom dancers
American draughtsmen
American education businesspeople
American entertainment industry businesspeople
American people of Austrian-Jewish descent
American people of Polish-Jewish descent
American reporters and correspondents
Austro-Hungarian emigrants to the United States
Austro-Hungarian Jews
Businesspeople from Atlanta
Businesspeople from Massachusetts
Businesspeople from New Jersey
Dance teachers
Dance education organizations
Educators from Georgia (U.S. state)
Educators from New Jersey
Georgia Tech alumni
Jews from Galicia (Eastern Europe)
People from the Kingdom of Galicia and Lodomeria
People from Pidhaitsi
20th-century American businesspeople